Mark Gray (born 16 August 1973) is an English professional pool player and former professional snooker player.

Snooker career

Born in 1973, Gray turned professional in 1992. He made little progress in any tournament until the 1997/1998 season, when he reached the last 64 at the German Open - losing 1–5 to Karl Broughton - the last 48 at the Thailand Masters, where Chris Small whitewashed him 5–0, and later made his first appearance in the last 32 at a ranking event, in the 1998 British Open. There, he defeated Jimmy Michie 5–3 and Jimmy White 5–4, but lost 3–5 to Dominic Dale.

The following season saw Gray repeat his feat at the British Open, beating Bjorn Haneveer 5–2, Paul Wykes 5–4 and Jamie Burnett 5–3, having trailed Burnett 1–3. He was again eliminated at the last 32 stage, this time 4–5 by Peter Ebdon.

Gray's ranking improved to a career-best 79th for the 1999/2000 season, but his form declined thereafter. In the 2000 UK Championship, he again met Small and led 3–2, but succumbed 3–9; he met Steve Davis in the last 48 at the 2001 Scottish Open, but was whitewashed 5–0 by the six-time World Champion.

Gray reached his first quarter-final at the 2001 Benson & Hedges Championship, but was defeated 1–5 by the eventual finalist, Hugh Abernethy.

Having finished the 2002/2003 season ranked 103rd, Gray dropped off the tour, and entered several qualifying events the following season to regain his place. He was successful in this, but played only four matches in the 2004/2005 season; the last of these, a 3–5 Malta Cup defeat to Darren Morgan, was Gray's final at competitive level. Finishing that season ranked 97th, he left the professional game once more at the age of 31.

Career finals

Non-ranking finals: 2 (1 title)

Pro-am finals: 2

Amateur finals: 1 (1 title)

Pool career
After his snooker career ended, Gray began playing pool, becoming a full-time professional player in 2010. In 2008, he was the number one nine-ball player in Britain and Europe, having won the 2007 Swiss 9-Ball Championship; Gray was also part of the Mosconi Cup-winning European team of 2008, 2014 and 2016. Alongside Daryl Peach, Gray was the runner up at the 2008 World Cup of Pool, losing to the American team of Rodney Morris and Shane Van Boening 11–7.

Career titles
 2016 Mosconi Cup
 2016 Euro Tour Austrian Open
 2015 GB Midlands Classic Main Event
 2015 Euro Tour Treviso Open
 2014 Mosconi Cup
 2014 Euro Tour Dutch Open
 2012 GB Southern Masters Challenge Cup
 2011 Sarajevo Coloseum 10-Ball Open 
 2011 Euro Tour Treviso Open
 2010 WPA World Team Championship
 2010 GB Midlands Classic Pro Cup
 2009 Euro Tour Costa del Sol Open
 2008 Mosconi Cup 
 2007 Euro Tour Swiss Open

References

Living people
English pool players
English snooker players
People from South Kesteven District
1973 births
Sportspeople from Lincolnshire